Philip Oxenden Papillon (1 August 1826 – 16 August 1899) was a British Conservative politician.

Life
He was the son of Thomas Papillon of Acrise and his wife Frances Mary Oxenden, daughter of Sir Henry Oxenden, 7th Baronet. He was educated at Rugby School from 1841, and matriculated at University College, Oxford in 1844, graduating B.A. in 1848 and M.A. in 1851. He was called to the bar at the Inner Temple in 1852.

Papillon was elected Conservative MP for Colchester at the 1859 general election and held the seat until 1865 when he stood for re-election but was defeated.

Family

Papillon married in 1862 Emily Caroline Garnier, third daughter of Thomas Garnier.

References

External links
 

UK MPs 1859–1865
1826 births
1899 deaths
Conservative Party (UK) MPs for English constituencies